The following is a timeline of the history of the municipality of Geneva, Switzerland.

Prior to 19th century

 1st century BCE – Roman camp "Genava" set up.
 4th century CE – Catholic diocese established.
 426 – Geneva becomes capital of the Kingdom of the Burgundians.
 534 – Franks in power.
 563 – Tsunami on Lake Geneva.
 773 - Charlemagne (Charles the Great) holds a council of war. 
 800 – Geneva becomes part of the Carolingian Empire (approximate date).
 1032 - Geneva reverts to Conrad II, Holy Roman Emperor 
 1321 – Fire.
 1333 – Fire.
 1387 – Town charter granted.
1400 – Sources indicate circa. 13 Jewish families living in Geneva.
1420 – The Jews of Geneva are confined to a ghetto (the only one in today's Switzerland).
 1430 – Fire.
 1478 – Printing press in operation.
1490 – The city council orders the expulsion of the Jews.
 1519 – Geneva allies with Freibourg.
 1524 – "The Genevese shake off the yoke of Savoy."
 1526 – Geneva allies with Bern.
 1530 - Geneva became its own mistress within, while allied externally with the Swiss confederation.
 1535 – Catholic bishop Pierre de La Baume ousted by Calvinists.
 1536
 21 May: Grand Council of Geneva adopts Protestant religion.
 Protestant leader John Calvin active in Geneva.
 Area of city expanded.
 1541 - The Republic of Geneva and Genevan Consistory established.
 1545 – 2 June: Divorce granted.
 1553 – 27 October: Michael Servetus executed for heresy.
 1559 – Collège de Genève founded.
 1560 – English-language Geneva Bible published.
 1580 – Population: 17,330.
 1584 – "Geneva forms an alliance with the Swiss cantons."
 1587 – Watchmaker  active.
 1602 – 21 December: "Savoy fails to conquer Geneva, an event celebrated as the 'Escalade'."
 1679 – French embassy established.
 1690 – Population: 16,220.
 1712 – 28 June: Jean-Jacques Rousseau born.
 1738 – "The republic adopts a regular constitution."
 1763 – Geneva is "made independent."
 1766 – Théâtre de Rosimond built.
 1770 – "Insurrection suppressed."
 1781 – February: Geneva Revolution of 1782.
 1783 – Théâtre de Neuve built.
 1789 – Trade show held.
 1794 – July: "Government overthrown;" "executions, etc."
 1798
 April: Geneva becomes capital of the Léman (department) of the First French Republic (later the First French Empire).
 Population: 24,331.

19th century
 1813 – 31 December: Restoration of the Republic.
 1815
 Canton of Geneva created.
 Canton of Geneva becomes part of the Swiss Confederation.
 1816 – Treaty of Turin nearly doubled the size of the Canton of Geneva.
 1821 – Catholic diocese of Lausanne and Geneva established.
 1825 – Prison begins operating.
 1826 – Musée Rath built.
 1828 –  (public welfare society) founded.
 1829 – Töpffer's Adventures of Dr. Festus comic book created.
 1834
 5 February: Polish-Sardinian unrest.
 Population: 27,177.
 1835 – Conservatoire de Musique de Genève founded.
 1837 – Société d'histoire et d'archéologie de Genève founded.
1841 – Jews granted freedom of establishment in the canton of Geneva. 
 1842
 Political unrest.
 Geneva municipality created.
 1845 – Gas lighting installed.
 1846 – Political unrest; "constitution made more democratic."
 1847 – "Radical party" in power.
 1848 – Banque de Geneve founded.
 1849 – Fortifications begin to be demolished.
 1850 – Population: 37,724 in city; 64,146 in canton.
 1851 – Watchmaker Patek Philippe & Co. in business.
 1852 
Union Chrétienne de Jeunes Gens branch established. 
Communauté Israélite de Genève founded.
 1854 – Jardin Anglais (park) laid out.
 1856 – Quai Gustave-Ador built.
 1858
 Genève-Cornavin railway station opens.
 Ecole Saint-Antoine (school) built.
 1860 – Population: 82,876 in canton.
 1863 – International Committee of the Red Cross headquartered in Geneva.
 1864
 August: International "Convention for the Amelioration of the Condition of the Wounded and Sick in Armed Forces in the Field" signed in Geneva, i.e. "the fundamental rules of war."
 22–23 August: "Election riots, with loss of life, through the indiscretion of M. Fazy;" city occupied by federal forces.
 Monument erected in Port-Noir.
 1867
 September: International "Congress of Peace" held in Geneva.
 Salle de la Réformation inaugurated.
 1873
 University of Geneva active.
 Christian Catholic Church is formally established.
 1879
 Grand Théâtre de Genève opens.
 Brunswick Monument erected.
 1880 – Population: 99,712 in canton.
 1881 – Société Genevoise de Photographie founded.
 1883 – 23 November: Steamboat collision on Lake Geneva.
 1886
 Geneva Seal adopted.
 Jet d'Eau (fountain) installed.
 1891 – International Peace Bureau headquartered in Geneva.
 1892 – 9 July: Steamboat explosion on Lake Geneva.
 1893 – Piolet Club (hiking group) formed.
 1894 – Victoria Hall (concert hall) built.
 1896 – 1 May:  opens in Geneva.
 1900 – Population: 97,359 in city; 132,609 in canton.

20th century

1900s–1940s
 1902 – 24 December: Cathedral bombing.
 1905 – Geneva Motor Show begins.
 1907 - The Genevese voted to separate Church and State.
 1910 – Musée d'Art et d'Histoire (Geneva) built.
 1917 – Monument to the Reformation built.
 1919 – International Labour Organization headquartered in Geneva.
 1920
 League of Nations headquartered in city.
 Alhambra cinema active.
 1921 – Inter-Parliamentary Union headquartered in Geneva.
 1924 – International School of Geneva established.
 1926
 26 September: International "Convention to Suppress the Slave Trade and Slavery" signed in Geneva.
 Compagnie de 1602 (heritage society) formed.
 1929 – 27 July: International "Convention relative to the Treatment of Prisoners of War" signed.
 1930
 Population: 124,121 in city; 171,366 in canton.
 ,  and Plainpalais become part of city.
 1932
 November: 1932 Geneva unrest
 International disarmament conference held in city.
1936 - World Jewish Congress is founded as political platform of solidarity for persecuted Jews and to combat anti-Semitism. 
 1938 – Palace of Nations built.
 1939 
Geneva International Music Competition begins.
Geneva hosts the World Zionist Congress.
 1942 - Start of Trolleybuses in Geneva.
 1947 – United Nations Economic Commission for Europe headquartered in Geneva.
 1948 – World Health Organization and World Council of Churches headquartered in Geneva.
 1949 – 12 August: International "Convention relative to the Protection of Civilian Persons in Time of War" signed in Geneva.

1950s–1990s
 1950
 United Nations High Commissioner for Refugees headquartered in Geneva.
 Population: 202,918 in canton.
 1954
 International conference related to Korea and Indochina held in Geneva.
 European Organization for Nuclear Research (CERN) headquartered in nearby Meyrin.
 1955 - L'horloge fleurie flowerbed created in the Jardin Anglais.
 1957 – Electric toothbrush invented.
 1960 - Women's suffrage effected in canton.
 1961 -  founded.
 1963 - United Nations Institute for Training and Research headquartered in Geneva.
 1964 - United Nations Conference on Trade and Development headquartered in Geneva.
 1970 - Population: 173,618 in city; 331,599 in canton.
 1972 - Tour du Lac rowing contest begins.
 1977 –  established.
 1978 - Geneva Mosque built.
 1980 –  established.
 1986 –  established.
 1987 – Geneva Airport railway station opens.
 1988 – International Red Cross and Red Crescent Museum opens.
 1989 – March: World Wide Web concept invented by Berners-Lee of CERN.
 1997 – Sculpture "Broken Chair" installed in the Place des Nations.
 2000 – Population: 177,964 in city; 413,673 in canton.

21st century

 2002 – City website online (approximate date).
 2004 – Genève-Sécheron railway station opens.
 2005 – Geneva Citizens' Movement established.
 2007 – RHINO (squat) evicted.
 2009
 November: Anti-WTO protest.
 November–December: World Trade Organization Ministerial Conference of 2009 held in Geneva.
 Calvin Jubilee held.
 2013
 Population: 469,433 in canton.
 2014 – Nuclear bunkers converted to homeless shelters.
 2015
 August: Intern-in-tent reported.
 Esther Alder becomes mayor.
 2019 - Opening of the CEVA rail line to Annemasse in France, operated by the Léman Express train service.

See also
 History of Geneva
 List of cultural property of national significance in Switzerland: Geneva
 Timelines of other municipalities in Switzerland: Basel, Bern, Zürich

References

This article incorporates information from the French Wikipedia and German Wikipedia.

Bibliography

in English
Published in the 17th–19th century
  (translated from French)
 
 
 
 
 
 
 

Published in the 20th century
 
 
 
 
 
 
 
 
 
 

Published in the 21st century

in French

External links

 Europeana. Items related to Geneva, various dates
 Digital Public Library of America. Items related to Geneva, various dates.

 
Geneva
Switzerland history-related lists
Years in Switzerland
Geneva-related lists